This is a list of bishops of Metz;  the Roman Catholic diocese of Metz now lies in eastern France.

To 500
 Clement of Metz (c. 280–300)
 Celestius
 Felix I
 Patient
 Victor I 344–346
 Victor II
 Simeon
 Sambace
 Rufus of Metz
 Adelphus
 Firmin
 Legonce
 Auctor c. 451
 Expiece
 Urbice
 Bonole
 Terence
 Consolin
 Romanus c. 486
 Phronimius to 497
 Grammatius 497?–512

From 500 to 1000
 Agatimber 512?–535
 Hesperius 525–542
 Villicus 542–568
 Peter 568?–578
 Aigulf or Agilulf 590 or 591-601
 Gondulf 591-???  (he was probably only  a chorbishop).
 Arnoald or Arnual or Arnoldus 601–609 or 611
 Pappolus 609?–614
 Arnulf 614–629 (Arnulfing)
 Goericus 629-644
 Godo 641?–652?
 Chlodulf, son of Arnulf, 652?–693? (Arnulfing)
 Albo 696-707
 Aptatus 707-715
 Felix II 715-716
 Sigibald 716-741
 Chrodegang 742–766
 Angilram 768–791
 Gundulf 819 to 7 September 822
 Drogo 823–8 December 855
Adventius 858 to 31 August 875
 Wala 876 to 12 April 882
 Robert I 883 to 2 January 916
 Wigerich 917 to 19 February 927
 Benno of Einsiedeln 927–929
 Adalbero I of Bar 929 to 26 April 962
 Dietrich I 964 to 7 September 984
 Adalbero II of Upper Lorraine 984 to 14 December 1005

1000 to 1300
 Dietrich II of Luxembourg 1006 to 30 April 1047
 Adalbero III of Luxembourg 1047 to 13 November 1072
 Hermann 1073 to 4 May 1090
 Bruno of Calw 1088–1089
 Bouchard 1090
 Poppo of Luxembourg 1090–1103
 Adalbero IV 1090–1117
 Theoger of Saint George 1118 to 29 April 1120
 Etienne de Bar 1120 to 29 December 1163
 Dietrich III of Bar 1164 to 8 August 1171
 Hugo of Clermont 1171
 Friedrich of Pluyvoise 1171–1173
 Dietrich IV of Lorraine 1173–1179
 Bertram 1180 to 6 April 1212 (1178-1179 archbishop of Bremen)
 Conrad III of Scharfenberg 1212 to 24 March 1224
 Johann of Aspremont 1224 to 10 December 1238
 Jacob of Lorraine 1239 to 24 October 1260
 Philip of Lorraine-Florenges 1261–1264
 Wilhelm of Traisnel 1264 to 4 January 1269
 Lorenz of Leistenberg 1270–1279
 John of Flanders 1280 to 31 October 1282
 Burkhard of Avesnes-Hennegau 1282 to 29 November 1296
 Gerhard of Rehlingen 1297 to 30 June 1302

1300–present

 Reginald of Bar 1302–1316
 Henri, Dauphin of Viennois 1316 to 24 November 1324
 Louis of Poitiers-Valentinois 1325–1327
 Ademar of Monteil 1327 to 12 May 1361
 Johann III of Vienne 1361–1365
 Dietrich V Bayer of Boppard 1365 to 18 January 1384
 Peter of Luxemburg 1384 to 2 July 1387
 Rudolf of Coucy 1388–1415
 Conrad II Bayer of Boppard 1416 to 20 April 1459
 George of Baden 1459 to 11 October 1484
 Henri of Lorraine-Vaudemont 1484 to 28 October 1505
 John, Cardinal of Lorraine 1505–1543
 Nicholas, Duke of Mercœur 1543–1548
 John, Cardinal of Lorraine 1548 to 19 May 1550
 Charles, Cardinal of Lorraine 1550 to 18 May 1551
 Robert de Lenoncourt 1551 to 25 September 1553
 François Beaucaire de Péguillon 1555–1568
 Louis I, Cardinal of Guise 1568 to 28 March 1578
 Charles III de Lorraine-Vaudémont 1578 to 24 November 1607
 Anne d'Escars de Givry 1608 to 19 April 1612
 Henri de Bourbon, duc de Verneuil 1612–1652 (last prince-bishop)
 Jules Mazarin 1652–1658
 Franz Egon of Fürstenberg 1658–1663
 Wilhelm Egon von Fürstenberg 1663–1668
 Georges d'Aubusson de la Feuillade 1669–1697
 Henri Charles du Cambout de Coislin 1697–1732
 Claude de Saint Simon 1733–1760
 Louis-Jean de Montmorency-Laval 1760–1802
 Nicolas Francin 1792–1802
 Pierre-François Bienaymé 1802–1806
 Gaspard-André Jauffret 1806–1823
 Jacques-François Besson 1824–1842
 Paul Dupont des Loges 1843–1886
 François Fleck 1886–1899
 Willibrord Benzler 1901–1919
 Jean-Baptiste Pelt 1919–1937
 Joseph-Jean Heintz 1938–1958
 Paul-Joseph Schmitt 1958–1987
 Pierre Raffin 1987-2013
 Jean-Christophe Lagleize 2013–2021
 Philippe Ballot 2022– present

Notes